The Communauté de communes de la Haute Somme is a communauté de communes in the Somme département and in the Hauts-de-France région of France. Its seat is in Péronne. Its area is 462.8 km2, and its population was 27,253 in 2018.

Composition
Since 2013, when it merged with the former Communauté de communes du canton de Combles and the Communauté de communes du canton de Roisel, it consists of 60 communes:

Aizecourt-le-Bas
Aizecourt-le-Haut
Allaines
Barleux
Bernes
Biaches
Bouchavesnes-Bergen
Bouvincourt-en-Vermandois
Brie
Buire-Courcelles
Bussu
Cartigny
Cléry-sur-Somme
Combles
Devise
Doingt
Driencourt
Épehy
Équancourt
Estrées-Mons
Éterpigny
Étricourt-Manancourt
Feuillères
Fins
Flaucourt
Flers
Ginchy
Gueudecourt
Guillemont
Guyencourt-Saulcourt
Hancourt
Hardecourt-aux-Bois
Hem-Monacu
Herbécourt
Hervilly
Hesbécourt
Heudicourt
Lesbœufs
Liéramont
Longavesnes
Longueval
Marquaix
Maurepas
Mesnil-Bruntel
Mesnil-en-Arrouaise
Moislains
Nurlu
Péronne
Pœuilly
Rancourt
Roisel
Ronssoy
Sailly-Saillisel
Sorel
Templeux-la-Fosse
Templeux-le-Guérard
Tincourt-Boucly
Villers-Carbonnel
Villers-Faucon
Vraignes-en-Vermandois

See also 
Communes of the Somme department

References 

Haute Somme
Haute Somme